= Gangammagudi =

Gangammagudi Arimanu Gangammagudi
- village
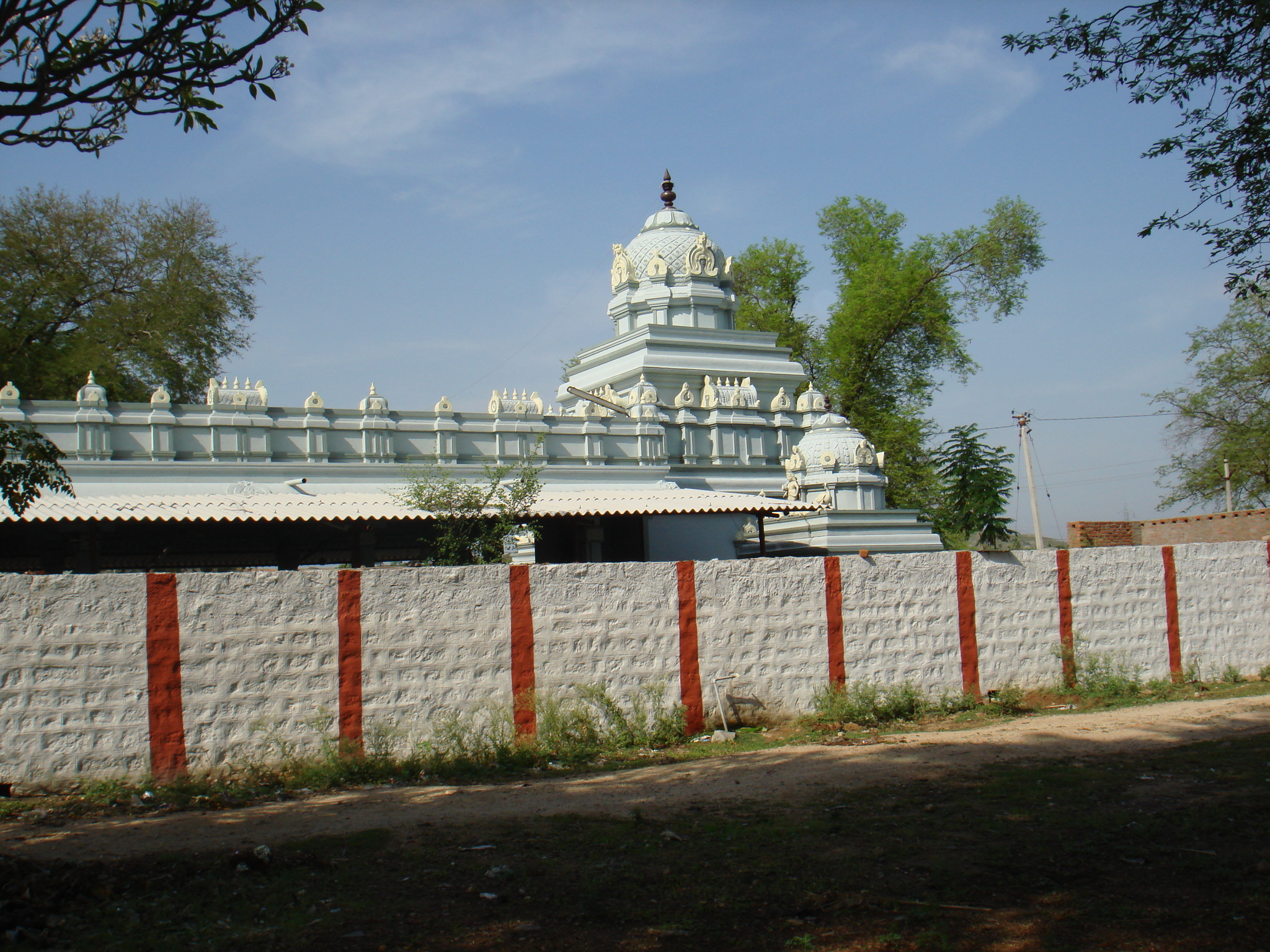
- Gangamma Gudi
- Country: India
- State: Andhra Pradesh
- District: Chittoor

Languages
  - Official: Telugu
- Time zone: UTC+5:30 (IST)
- PIN: 517167
- Vehicle registration: AP 03
- Nearest city: Chittoor
- Lok Sabha constituency: Chittoor
- Vidhan Sabha constituency: Gangadnellor

Gangammagudi is a village located in Srirangarajapuram mandal of Chittoor district, Andhra Pradesh, India. The name of the village is derived from a famous local temple located in the village dedicated to Goddess Gangamma. It is a 40 min. drive from Chittoor.

== Economy ==
The major source of economy of the village is from Agriculture with Sugarcane, Rice, Mango and Ground nut being the major crops grown throughout the year.
